The 51st parallel south is a circle of latitude that is 51 degrees south of the Earth's equatorial plane. It crosses the Atlantic Ocean, the Indian Ocean, the Pacific Ocean and South America.

At this latitude the sun is visible for 16 hours, 33 minutes during the December solstice and 7 hours, 55 minutes during the June solstice.

Around the world
Starting at the Prime Meridian and heading eastwards, the parallel 51° south passes through:

{| class="wikitable plainrowheaders"
! scope="col" width="125" | Co-ordinates
! scope="col" | Country, territory or ocean
! scope="col" | Notes
|-
| style="background:#b0e0e6;" | 
! scope="row" style="background:#b0e0e6;" | Atlantic Ocean
| style="background:#b0e0e6;" |
|-
| style="background:#b0e0e6;" | 
! scope="row" style="background:#b0e0e6;" | Indian Ocean
| style="background:#b0e0e6;" |
|-valign="top"
| style="background:#b0e0e6;" | 
! scope="row" style="background:#b0e0e6;" | Pacific Ocean
| style="background:#b0e0e6;" | Passing just south of Adams Island, Auckland Islands, 
|-valign="top"
| 
! scope="row" | 
| Patagonic Archipelago and mainland, Magallanes Region
|-
| 
! scope="row" | 
| Santa Cruz Province
|-valign="top"
| style="background:#b0e0e6;" | 
! scope="row" style="background:#b0e0e6;" | Atlantic Ocean
| style="background:#b0e0e6;" | Passing just north of the Jason Islands,  (UK Territory claimed by )
|}

See also
50th parallel south
52nd parallel south

References

s51